Robert Longhurst is an American sculptor who was born in Schenectady, New York in 1949. At an early age he was fascinated by his father's small figurative woodcarvings.

Longhurst received a Bachelor of Architecture from Kent State University in 1975.  He began his artistic career in 1976 in Cincinnati, Ohio.  His first commissioned works were three figurative sculptures in black walnut for Cincinnati businessman Joe David who owned Midwest Woodworking company.  In 1978 Longhurst completed a life size figure in pine of an Adirondack hermit, Noah John Rondeau for the Adirondack Museum in Blue Mountain Lake, New York.

Although Longhurst's career began with figurative works, it soon evolved into non-representational abstraction in exotic woods, marble and granite that draws on his background in Architecture.  Many of his pieces are defined as being at the intersection of where the fields of art and math overlap, and they have been discussed by mathematicians such as Nathaniel Friedman, Reuben Hersh, and Ivars Peterson.  Some of his sculptures portray minimal surfaces, which were named after German geometer Alfred Enneper.  Nathaniel Friedman writes, "The surfaces [of Longhurst's sculptures] generally have appealing sections with negative curvature (saddle surfaces).  This is a natural intuitive result of Longhurst's feeling for satisfying shape rather than a mathematically deduced result."

Longhurst participated in the International Snow Sculpture Championships in Breckenridge, Colorado, in 2000 and 2001, by joining a snow sculpting team from Minnesota.  Two of his sculptures representing minimal surfaces were enlarged and carved from blocks of snow measuring 12' high x 10' wide x 10' deep.  In the 2000 championships, the team received second place, Artists' Choice Award, and People's Choice Award.

Robert Longhurst lives in Chestertown, New York.

Selected Collections

Adirondack Museum - Blue Mountain Lake, New York
American Financial Corporation - Cincinnati, Ohio
Amoco Corporation - Chicago, Illinois
ANA (All Nippon Airways) Hotel - Tokyo, Japan
AT&T - Chicago, Illinois
Bank of Tokyo - New York, New York
Bastion Industries - New York, New York
BMC Software - Houston, Texas
Bohlke Veneer Corporation - Fairfield, Ohio
Brown-Forman Corporation - Louisville, Kentucky
Burlington Northern Railroad - Fort Worth, Texas
Champlin Oil Corporation - Fort Worth, Texas
Chester B. Stem Incorporated - New Albany, Indiana
Cornerstone Holdings Corporation - Aspen, Colorado
Crown Associates Realty Incorporated - Beverly Hills, California
Dana–Farber Cancer Institute – Boston, Massachusetts
Danis Industries - Dayton, Ohio
Duke University - Durham, North Carolina
Empire Capital Corporation - Southport, Connecticut
Ensign-Bickford Industries - Simsbury, Connecticut
Fuqua Industries - Atlanta, Georgia
Ideal Textile Company - Los Angeles, California
International Woodworking Fair - Norcross, Georgia
Gary Kaplan & Associates - Los Angeles, California
Kimball International - Jasper, Indiana
Louisville Courier Journal & Times - Louisville, Kentucky
Midwest Woodworking Company - Cincinnati, Ohio
Museum of Arts and Design - New York, New York
National City Bank - Marion, Ohio
National Reinsurance Corporation - Stamford, Connecticut
Northern Natural Gas Company - Omaha, Nebraska
Norton Simon Collection - New York, New York
Prime Holding Company - Austin, Texas
Royal Caribbean Cruise Lines - Oslo, Norway
Seamless Technologies Incorporated - Morristown, New Jersey
Seemac Incorporated - Carmel, Indiana
Seven Bridges Foundation - Greenwich, CT
Shipman Goodwin - Hartford, Connecticut
Smithsonian American Art Museum - Washington, D.C.
Southwest Psychiatric Associates - Torrance, California
Sperry Corporation - New York, New York
Takasago International Corporation - Rockleigh, New Jersey
Corning Tropel Corp. - Fairport, New York
Valley National Bank - McAllen, Texas
University of Michigan - Ann Arbor, Michigan
Victor Wire & Cable - Los Angeles, California
Wigand Corporation - Dallas, Texas

References

External links
 Robert Longhurst’s website
  The website of Dr. Carlo H. Sequin, a professor of Computer Science at UC Berkeley
  Hyperseeing (The Journal of the International Society of the Arts, Mathematics, and Architecture), November 2006
  Hyperseeing (The Journal of the International Society of the Arts, Mathematics, and Architecture), July 2007
  Longhurst's Surface, a part of Minimal Surface Archive created by Dr. Matthias Weber, a professor of Mathematics at Indiana University
 Cline Fine Art Gallery

1949 births
Living people
Mathematical artists
20th-century American sculptors
20th-century American male artists
21st-century American sculptors
21st-century American male artists
American male sculptors
American woodcarvers
Kent State University alumni
People from Schenectady, New York